The 2001 Parramatta Eels season was the 55th in the club's history. Coached by Brian Smith and captained by Nathan Cayless, they competed in the National Rugby League's 2001 Telstra Premiership, reaching the 2001 NRL Grand final.

Summary
In 2001, Parramatta set a regular-season points scoring record in the premiership by scoring 839 points in 26 matches on their way to claiming the minor premiership. In their fifth consecutive Finals Series, Parramatta dominated the series, starting with a 56–12 victory over the New Zealand Warriors at Parramatta Stadium in front of 17,336. After getting a week off, Parramatta defeated the Brisbane Broncos at Stadium Australia, 24–16 in the rematch of the 2000 preliminary final.

Parramatta went into the decider as hot favourites after losing just once in 22 matches. Despite this the team was defeated in their first grand final appearance in fifteen years. They lost 30–24 against the Newcastle Knights, trailing 24–0 at half-time. 

Parramatta set a number of point scoring records throughout the season which as of 2023 are yet to be broken which include, most points in a regular season (839). They also set the record for most tries (159) and most points (943) in a full premiership season. The 2001 Parramatta side also held the records for most tries in a regular season and highest points differential of any side in a regular season, however both of these records were broken by Melbourne in the 2021 NRL season.

Standings

Awards

Michael Cronin clubman of the year award: Brett Hodgson
Ken Thornett Medal (Players' player): Nathan Hindmarsh
Jack Gibson Award (Coach's award): Jamie Lyon
Eric Grothe Rookie of the Year Award: Danny Sullivan

References

Parramatta Eels seasons
Parramatta Eels season